Ischnocolus is a genus of tarantulas that was first described by Anton Ausserer in 1871. This tarantula genus includes some of the smallest in the family.

Diagnosis 
Males of this genus can be distinguished by the palpal bulb morphology, which owns a slightly bent apical end. Females can be distinguished by the morphology of the spermatheca, which is made up of two twisted receptacles.

Species
 it contains eight species, found in Europe, Asia, Africa, and Brazil:
Ischnocolus elongatus (Simon, 1873) – Morocco, Algeria
Ischnocolus hancocki Smith, 1990 – Morocco
Ischnocolus ignoratus Guadanucci & Wendt, 2014 – Israel, Syria
Ischnocolus jickelii L. Koch, 1875 – Ethiopia, Eritrea, Djibouti, Somalia, Yemen, Saudi Arabia, Oman, United Arab Emirates
Ischnocolus mogadorensis Simon, 1909 -  Morocco, Western Sahara 
Ischnocolus rubropilosus Keyserling, 1891 – Brazil
Ischnocolus tomentosus Thorell, 1899 – Cameroon, Congo
Ischnocolus valentinus (Dufour, 1820) (type) – Spain, Italy (Sicily), Morocco, Algeria, Tunesia, Libya
Ischnocolus vanandelae Montemor, West & Zamani, 2020 – Oman, Iran

In synonymy 
I. adenensis (Simon, 1890) = Ischnocolus jickelii L. Koch, 1875
I. africanus (Ausserer, 1875) = Ischnocolus elongatus (Simon, 1873)
I. algericus Thorell, 1875 = Ischnocolus valentinus (Dufour, 1820)
I. andalusiacus (Simon, 1873) = Ischnocolus valentinus (Dufour, 1820)
I. cavicola (Simon, 1889) = Ischnocolus valentinus (Dufour, 1820)
I. fuscostriatus Simon, 1885 = Ischnocolus valentinus (Dufour, 1820)
I. holosericeus L. Koch, 1871 = Ischnocolus valentinus (Dufour, 1820)
I. maroccanus (Simon, 1873) = Ischnocolus valentinus (Dufour, 1820)
I. mogadorensis Simon, 1909 = Ischnocolus valentinus (Dufour, 1820)
I. numidus Simon, 1909 = Ischnocolus valentinus (Dufour, 1820)
I. triangulifer Ausserer, 1871 = Ischnocolus valentinus (Dufour, 1820)
I. tripolitanus Caporiacco, 1937 = Ischnocolus valentinus (Dufour, 1820)

Nomina dubia

Transferred to other genera

See also
 List of Theraphosidae species

References

Theraphosidae genera
Spiders of Africa
Spiders of Asia
Spiders of Brazil
Taxa named by Anton Ausserer
Theraphosidae